Anoplocephala magna is a species of flatworm belonging to the family Anoplocephalidae.

The species has almost cosmopolitan distribution.

References

Platyhelminthes